Yongchuan Prison is a prison in the municipality of Chongqing, China. It was established in 1952. It is located on the Xinsheng Tea Farm, and is the largest tea farm in China producing Yuzhou Tea, Biluochun green tea, Junshan Yinzhen tea, and Maofeng tea. It has approximately one thousand inmates.

See also
List of prisons in Chongqing municipality

References
Laogai Research Foundation Handbook

Prisons in Chongqing
1952 establishments in China